A Doll's House is a 1973 British film, directed by Patrick Garland.  It is based on Henrik Ibsen's play A Doll's House (1879).

Plot
Nora Helmer, the lead character, is married to the authoritarian and controlling Torvald Helmer. The couple have a reasonably happy relationship until past actions and outside forces cause Nora to realise her situation may not be as idyllic as she once thought.

Cast
 Claire Bloom as Nora Helmer
 Anthony Hopkins as Torvald Helmer
 Ralph Richardson as Dr. Rank
 Denholm Elliott as Nils Krogstad
 Edith Evans as Anne-Marie
 Anna Massey as Kristine Linde
 Helen Blatch as Helen
 Kimberley Hampton as Bob
 Daphne Riggs as Old Woman
 Mark Summerfield as Ivar
 Stefanie Summerfield as Emmy

References

External links
 
 
 

1973 films
1970s historical drama films
British historical drama films
Films based on A Doll's House
Films scored by John Barry (composer)
Films set in the 1870s
1973 drama films
1970s English-language films
1970s British films